Pinedale (also spelled Pine Dale) is an unincorporated community in McKinley County, New Mexico, United States.

Paddy Martinez, the Navajo American man who discovered high grade uranium ore that initiated the Grants, New Mexico uranium mining boom was born in Pinedale.

Demographics

Education
It is in Gallup-McKinley County Public Schools.

References

Unincorporated communities in New Mexico
Unincorporated communities in McKinley County, New Mexico